Sindhu Pushkaram is a festival of River Sindhu normally occurs once in 12 years. This Pushkaram is observed for a period  of 12 days from the time of entry of Jupiter into Kumbha rasi (Aquarius).

Celebrations 2021 
Sindhu  Pushkaram is being celebrated in Leh at Sindh Ghat.

Being an ecologically very sensitive area, it is expected of the devotees to be more sensitive and does not litter the Holy Sindhu.

See also 
Kumbh Mela
Pushkaram

References

Religious festivals in India
Water and Hinduism
Hindu festivals
Religious tourism in India
Hindu pilgrimages